This is a list of bridges, tunnels, and other crossings of the Fraser River in the Canadian province of British Columbia.  It includes both functional crossings and historic crossings which no longer exist, and lists them in sequence from the South Arm of the Fraser River at the Strait of Georgia upstream to its source.  Listed separately on this page are the crossings on the Fraser River's North and Middle Arms.

Fraser River Delta (Strait of Georgia to New Westminster)

South Arm
This is a list of crossings of the South Arm of the Fraser River from the Strait of Georgia to the North Arm of the Fraser River at approximately mile 16.5. The South Arm is the primary outflow branch of the Fraser River.

Middle Arm 
This is a list of crossings of the Middle Arm of the Fraser River from the Strait of Georgia to the North Arm of the Fraser River at approximately mile 4.6.

North Arm 
This is a list of crossings of the North Arm of the Fraser River from the Strait of Georgia to the main body of the Fraser River at approximately mile 16.5. The North Arm is the secondary outflow branch of the Fraser River.

Main Watercourse (New Westminster to Yellowhead Pass)

See also

List of crossings of the Thompson River
List of crossings of the Nechako River

References

Fraser River
Lists of river crossings
crossings